Neoclytus steelei is a species of beetle in the family Cerambycidae. It was described by Chemsak and Linsley in 1978.

References

Neoclytus
Beetles described in 1978
Taxa named by Earle Gorton Linsley